Speed is a 1925 American silent comedy drama film directed by Edward LeSaint and starring Betty Blythe, Pauline Garon, and Arthur Rankin.

Plot
As described in a film magazine review, because they are called "old fashioned" by their children, Mr. and Mrs. Whipple buy a car, plan a trip out West, and decide to jazz things up some themselves. Their daughter Wiletta accompanies them on the trip, leaving her sheik behind. Out West she meets Nat, who helps in preventing the two parents from being swindled in a deal for a gold mine. There follows a kidnapping, a holdup, and a chase down a mountainside to save Wiletta. At the end, all of them determine to give up modern jazz methods.

Cast

Preservation
A print of Speed is held in the Gosfilmofond film archive in Moscow.

References

Bibliography
 Munden, Kenneth White. The American Film Institute Catalog of Motion Pictures Produced in the United States, Part 1. University of California Press, 1997.

External links

1925 films
1925 drama films
American black-and-white films
Silent American drama films
American silent feature films
1920s English-language films
Films directed by Edward LeSaint
1920s American films